Self-defence is a defence permitting reasonable force to be used to defend one's self or another. This defence arises both from common law and the Criminal Law Act 1967. Self-defence is a justification defence rather than an excuse.

Principles

Common law (self defence)

The common law defence of self-defence applies where the defendant uses necessary, reasonable and proportionate force to defend themselves or another from imminent attack. It is a complete defence to all non-sexual offences involving the unlawful use of force (anything from battery to murder). Because the defence results in a complete acquittal, the courts have interpreted the defence in a restrictive way so as to avoid acquitting too easily. For example, the courts will not usually acquit the defendant just because he thought the force used was reasonable – whether or not the force used was reasonable will be objectively assessed by the jury and not simply according to what the defendant thought at the time.

Lord Morris in Palmer v R stated the following about someone confronted by an intruder or defending himself against attack:

Reasonable force
Force is reasonable if a reasonable person would think it necessary to use force and would have used the same level of force as the defendant. This test is fundamentally objective: the defendant may not decide for himself what is reasonable based on his own values. However, the hypothetical reasonable person is imbued with the defendant's factual beliefs about the circumstances. This is the case even if the defendant's beliefs about the circumstances are mistaken.

Whether the force was reasonable is a question of fact for the jury. The jury may take into account all relevant circumstances of the case, including the level of threat (as the defendant believed it to be), the pressure of being under attack, the likely harm and the interests the defendant was protecting. However, the jury may not rely on facts unknown to the defendant. For example, if the defendant was unaware that the victim had a knife, the jury must ignore the fact that the victim was armed.

The classic test comes from the case of Palmer v The Queen, on appeal to the Privy Council in 1971:

The Legal Aid, Sentencing and Punishment of Offenders Act 2012 inserted a new section 76(6A) into the Criminal Justice and Immigration Act 2008. This provision clarifies that there is no duty to retreat, although an opportunity to retreat may still be taken into account when assessing whether the force was reasonable.

In R v Lindsay, the defendant, who picked up a sword in self-defence when attacked in his home by three masked intruders armed with loaded handguns, killed one of them by slashing him repeatedly. The prosecution case was that, although he had initially acted in self-defence, he had then lost his self-control and demonstrated a clear intent to kill the armed intruder. The Court of Appeal confirmed an eight-year term of imprisonment.

In April 2013, the Crime and Courts Act 2013 further amended section 76. This amended the law to clarify that allow homeowners may still rely on self-defence in some cases where the force used is unreasonable, so long as it is not grossly disproportionate. This was further clarified by the High Court in January 2016.

Belief in imminent attack
The modern law on belief is stated in R v Owino:

If the defendant genuinely believes that an attack is imminent or underway, it does not matter that they were mistaken.

Preemptive self-defence is permissible in some cases. Lord Griffith said in Beckford v R:

A defendant does not necessarily lose the right to claim self-defence merely because they instigated the confrontation. In some cases, a person who kills in the course of a quarrel or crime they started might still act in self-defence if the victim disproportionately escalates the violence. In Rashford, the defendant sought out the victim, intending to attack him as revenge for an earlier dispute. The victim and his friends responded out of proportion to the defendant's aggression. At this point, the defendant had to switch from aggression to defence. The Court of Appeal held that the defendant will only lose the defence by being the aggressor throughout. The question is whether the defendant feared that he was in immediate danger from which he had no other means of escape, and if the violence he used was no more than appeared necessary to preserve his own life or protect himself from serious injury, he would be entitled to rely on self-defence. On the facts, the jury's decision to convict was not unsafe.

Intoxication
The rule that the defendant can rely on any honest belief is altered where the defendant has consumed alcohol or drugs. In R v Letenock, the defendant claimed mistakenly to believe that the victim was about to attack him. The judge directed the jury that his drunkenness was irrelevant unless he was so drunk as to be incapable of knowing what he was doing. The Court of Criminal Appeal quashed his conviction for murder and substituted a verdict of manslaughter. Lord Reading CJ said at 224:

This suggests that the question is whether there was any intelligible basis for the defendant’s belief. Hatton held that a defendant who raised the issue of self-defence was not entitled to rely on a mistaken belief induced by voluntary intoxication, regardless of whether the defence was raised against a charge of murder or one of manslaughter. This applied the ratio decidendi in R v O' Grady for murder and R v Majewski for manslaughter. It follows that, if the defendant is voluntarily drunk and kills in what he mistakenly imagines to be self-defence because he imagines (as in Hatton) that the deceased was attacking him with a sword, he has no defence to a charge of murder; but if he claims to be so intoxicated that he is experiencing hallucinations and imagines that he is fighting giant snakes (as in Lipman) then he can be guilty only of manslaughter.

The House of Commons Library compiled a list of people who have acted in self-defence as part of its briefing on the Criminal Law (Amendment) (Householder Protection) Bill 2005.

Statutory law
Section 3 of the Criminal Law Act 1967 provides that:

The definition of what constitutes a 'crime' was clarified under R v Jones (Margaret), R v Milling et al: HL 29 MAR 2006 which stated it covered any domestic criminal offence under the law of England and Wales.

Thus, reasonable force can be used in the prevention of any crime or in making an arrest to:
allow the defendant to defend himself from any form of attack so long as the attack is criminal.
prevent an attack on another person, e.g. in R v Rose, a young son shot dead his father to protect his mother from a serious assault, believing that this was the only practical way of defending her given his small physical size.
defend his property against criminal attack in the widest sense, i.e. it can be physical possessions like a watch or credit cards demanded by a mugger (where there would also be physical danger to the owner) or, at the other extreme, possession of land.

Section 76 of the Criminal Justice and Immigration Act 2008 codifies English case law on self-defence. It made no changes to the law. However, the section was amended on 25 April 2013 by section 43 of the Crime and Courts Act 2013 to allow people to use greater force in defence of their homes against burglars. In those circumstances, force need no longer be reasonable as long as it is not "grossly disproportionate."

The Human Rights Act 1998 incorporates into English law article 2 of the European Convention on Human Rights, which defines the right to life as follows:

 Everyone's right to life shall be protected by law. No one shall be deprived of his life intentionally save in the execution of a sentence of a court following his conviction of a crime for which this penalty is provided by law.
 Deprivation of life shall not be regarded as inflicted in contravention of this Article when it results from the use of force which is no more than absolutely necessary:
 (a) in defence of any person from unlawful violence;
 (b) in order to effect a lawful arrest or to prevent the escape of a person lawfully detained;
 (c) in action lawfully taken for the purpose of quelling a riot or insurrection.

Action by private citizens

Arrest 
Private citizens have a power to arrest any person for an indictable offence (Citizen's arrest) under s24A PACE1984 and the common law breach of the peace power to arrest. Where this power is lawfully exercised, the citizen may use reasonable force and other reasonable means to effect it. In R v Renouf, the Court of Appeal ruled that s3(1) was available against a charge of reckless driving where the defendant had used his car to chase some people who had assaulted him and had manoeuvred his car to prevent their escape. Lawton LJ said:

Prevention of Crime 
The right to use reasonable force to prevent crime comes from statute (S3 Criminal Law Act 1967). The definition of reasonable force is the same as the self-defence test. The definition of what constitutes a "crime" was clarified in R v Jones (Margaret)[2005] QB 259 as any domestic crime in England or Wales. Unlike self-defence, this defence also applies to the prevention of crimes which do not involve an attack on a person, such as defence of property.

This is harder to get wrong as the test is whether:

 subjectively you honestly believed there was an imminent crime AND
 objectively you used reasonable force in the circumstances as you believed them to be

So there might only be a summary offence or no offence; you don’t have to tell them anything; you don’t have to wait for the police. But like arrest, it does have to be to prevent crime or escape. You don’t have to retreat (although that is a factor in assessing reasonableness), or wait for the first blow, but must not take revenge. Revenge is evidence of unreasonableness and seeking confrontation removes the defence. No force might be reasonable if a threat would have sufficed. A witness to violent crime with a continuing threat of violence may well be justified in using extreme force to remove a threat of further violence (CPS guidance). Physical characteristics can be relevant to reasonableness, e.g. in a fist fight a man twice the size should take it easy or resist provocation. Injuries are relevant to reasonableness and public interest once unreasonableness has been found. CPS say that leeway should be given to those who have to confront in their job such as bouncers. It would be different if the court thought volunteers went out looking for confrontations. The CPS are told not to prosecute if the accused acted reasonably in preventing crime or apprehending offenders, but a factor is whether self defence was more vigilantism and violence than preserving law and order. They are supposed to allow leeway for excessive force that is not far from reasonable.

The CPS first have to check they can probably rebut self-defence beyond reasonable doubt, and even if they can then they have to check if prosecution is in the public interest. To prove assault despite a claim of self-defence CPS must prove beyond reasonable doubt that it was not defence of person or property or crime prevention or lawful arrest, or that force was excessive. Serious injury or use of weapons or ambush usually requires prosecution due to public interest if the force is unreasonable whereas minor injuries can suggest the public interest does not require prosecution. In case the CPS are dubious of your claim that force was reasonable, only using your bare hands, protecting the suspect from injury and only intervening in unexpected incidents rather than laying in wait are ways to try to prevent prosecution. CPS should be slow to prosecute where the public interest is affected by the complainant having been committing crime at the time; factors then include the damage or injury caused by the complainant and whether overzealous force was used to honestly uphold the law without revenge or vigilantism. CPS guidance is that violence is to be discouraged but responsible public spirited crime prevention is to be encouraged and they are to carefully balance the two.

Prevention of breach of peace 
You can use reasonable force to stop a likely breach of the peace, ie likely injury or damage to a witness's property (but not mere abuse or disturbance unless it makes you fear such injury or damage). This potentially gets around the problem that assault and threatening behaviour are summary offences. Breach of the peace is not a crime but is arrestable and can lead to binding over. Uniquely the power of arrest comes from a duty to prevent breach of the peace. (There is a wider duty to preserve the public peace on request by the police, failure without lawful excuse is indictable if able bodied). The courts accept that this is an ‘imperfect’ obligation so is no longer enforced. The risk of breach of the peace breaking out must be more than a real possibility but you are not expected to wait until crisis management is the only option. The police have more power as they can give a warning to cease disturbance then arrest for obstruction before breach of the peace is imminent. An example of a valid citizens arrest to prevent breach of the peace was where an off duty constable bundled a man off a bus who barged ahead of the queue at the bus stop which he feared would provoke an affray.

Use of force by police officers
The use of force to prevent crime, including crimes against property, should be considered justifiable because of the utility to society, i.e. a police officer using reasonable force to lawfully arrest a criminal or suspect maximizes net utility. But, where the officers make mistakes, the law can be unpredictable. In R v Dadson, a police officer shot and wounded an escaping thief. At the time, any degree of force could be used to arrest a fleeing felon but, when he fired the gun, he did not know who the thief was. He was convicted of intentionally causing grievous bodily harm because the thief was shot and the gun was fired by a man not caring whether the shot was lawful or not. That the thief was later proved to be a felon did not prevent a concurrence between actus reus and mens rea at the instant the shot was fired, i.e. no retrospective justification is allowed. It is noted that the death of Jean Charles de Menezes at the Stockwell tube station, south London, on 22 July 2005 resulted from the use of a then secret shoot-to-kill policy called Operation Kratos. English law has no general defence of superior orders, and the conduct of every police officer has to be judged on the facts as they believed them to be.

In R v Pagett, to resist lawful arrest, the defendant held a pregnant girl in front of him as a shield and shot at armed policemen who returned fire as permitted under their rules of engagement, killing the girl. It is a proportionate response to shooting, to shoot back. In balancing the harms, the greater harm to be avoided is a violent suspect firing and killing a police officer or any other bystander. On the issue of whether the defendant caused the victim's death, the Court of Appeal held that the reasonable actions of a third party acting in self-defence and defence of others could not be regarded as a novus actus interveniens because self-defence was a foreseeable consequence of his action and had not broken the chain of causation.

In Beckford v R the defendant police officer was told that a suspect was armed and dangerous. When that man ran out of a house towards him, the defendant shot him because he feared for his own life. The prosecution case was that the victim had been unarmed and thus presented no threat to the defendant. Lord Griffiths approved a model direction to juries, laid down by Lord Lane in R. v Williams:

The defendant, therefore, had a defence of self-defence because the killing was not unlawful if, in the circumstances, as he perceived them to be, he had used reasonable force to defend himself.

Use of force by soldiers
Since the "war on terrorism" began in 2001, the UK has seen a substantial increase in the use of armed police officers. The issue of the extent to which soldiers may be allowed to shoot a suspect in defence of themselves and others has therefore become more relevant to English law, although it has always been highly relevant given the role of the military in the policing of Northern Ireland. In AG for Northern Ireland's Reference, a soldier on patrol in Northern Ireland shot and killed an unarmed man, who ran away when challenged. The trial judge held that the prosecution had failed to prove that the soldier intended to kill or cause serious bodily harm, and that the homicide was justifiable under section 3 of the Criminal Law Act (Northern Ireland) 1967 (identical wording to the English section). The Lords decided that the judge's ruling was purely one of fact, and therefore declined to answer the legal question of justification. But Lord Diplock commented:

In R v Clegg Lord Lloyd of Berwick said at 497:

One interpretation would be that, when a government deploys highly armed soldiers, equipped and trained to kill, in a civilian area, the law must give the armed forces greater licence to kill than would be granted to any other person including, presumably, a less lethally equipped police officer. In the event, Private Clegg was convicted of murder. He had been on patrol to catch joyriders, and fired three shots at the windscreen of a speeding car as it approached the checkpoint. He fired a fourth shot, killing a passenger, after the car had passed him and was speeding away. The first three shots were fired in self-defence, or in defence of fellow soldiers, but the fourth shot was not a response to imminent danger. The judge dismissed the evidence of bruising to a fellow soldier's leg as a fabrication to suggest injury to that soldier from the car. The Lords observed that army Rules of Engagement given to every soldier on a "yellow card" entitled "[i]nstructions for opening fire in Northern Ireland" could, on a literal reading, justify firing on a car where a person had been injured by it, irrespective of the seriousness of the injury. But, in any event, the Lords said that the card had no legal force because English law does not have a general defence of superior orders. Lord Lloyd of Berwick cited with approval the Australian High Court in A v Hayden (No 2) followed by the Privy Council in Yip Chiu-Cheung v The Queen where the "good" motive of the undercover drug enforcement officer was irrelevant (the accused conspired to take drugs from Hong Kong to Australia - as the officer intended the agreement to be carried out to break a drugs ring, a conspiracy between the two was proved. In A v Hayden, Murphy J. stated:

Reform
The Law Commission's report on Partial Defences to Murder rejects the notion of creating a mitigatory defence to cover the use of excessive force in self-defence, but accepts that the "all or nothing" effect can produce unsatisfactory results in murder cases. For example, a battered woman or abused child using excessive force because they are physically at a disadvantage and not under imminent attack, would be denied a defence. Further, an occupant not sure if violence to defend their property against invasion is reasonable, may feel forced to do nothing. It was always possible the same set of facts could be interpreted as either self-defence or provocation where there was a loss of control resulting in death. Thus, the Commission recommends a redefinition of provocation to cover situations where a person acts lethally out of fear. This reflects the present view of psychiatrists that most people act in violent situations with a combination of fear and anger in their minds, and to separate the two emotions is not legally constructive.

See also
 Castle doctrine

References

Self-defense
English criminal law